The Black Abbot may refer to

 The Black Abbot (book), a 1926 crime novel by Edgar Wallace
 The Black Abbot (1934 film), an unrelated British film starring Richard Cooper
 The Black Abbot (1963 film), a German crime film based on the novel